Millennium Park is a park in Chicago, Illinois.

Millennium Park may also refer to:
 Millennium Park (Calgary), Canada
 Millennium Park (Kolkata), India
 Millennium Park (Abuja), Nigeria
 Millennium Park (Grand Rapids), a park in Grand Rapids, Michigan, U.S.
 Millennium Park (Manhattan), a park in New York City
 , a park in Kazan, Russia
Millennium Park (Boston), a park in Boston, Massachusetts